Pouteria glauca is a species of plant in the family Sapotaceae. It is endemic to Peru. It is listed as "vulnerable" in the endangered species of wildlife list.

References

Flora of Peru
glauca
Vulnerable plants
Taxonomy articles created by Polbot